The Socialist Party (abbreviated as SP) is a democratic socialist political party in the Netherlands. Founded in 1971 as the Communist Party of the Netherlands/Marxist–Leninist (KPN/ML), the party has since moderated itself from Marxism–Leninism and Maoism towards democratic socialism and social democracy. The SP has also been described as left-wing populist and soft Eurosceptic, and is an advocate of Dutch republicanism.

Positioned to the political left of the Labour Party, the party has been part of the parliamentary opposition since it was formed. After the 2006 Dutch general election, the SP became one of the major parties of the Netherlands winning 25 out of 150 parliamentary seats, an increase of 16 seats. In the 2010 Dutch general election, the parliamentary presence of the socialists decreased to 15 seats. In the 2012 Dutch general election, the party maintained those 15 seats. Following the 2017 and 2021 general elections, the SP fell back to the nine seats it held before 2006.

History

Foundation until 1994 
The Socialist Party was founded in October 1971 as a Maoist party named the Communist Party of the Netherlands/Marxist–Leninist (KPN/ML). This KPN/ML was formed following a split from the Communist Unity Movement of the Netherlands (Marxist–Leninist). In 1972, the KPN/ML changed its name to the Socialist Party. Even in its early years, while adhering to Maoist principles such as organising the masses, the SP was very critical of the Communist Party of China, condemning the support of the Chinese party for UNITA in Angola with the brochure "" ('Answer to the thick skins of the KEN').

The SP started to build a network of local parties, with strong local roots. The SP had its own General Practitioners' offices, provided advice to citizens and set up local action groups. This developed within front organisations, separate trade unions, environmental organisations and tenant associations. This work resulted in a strong representation in several municipal legislatures, notably in Oss. Also in some States-Provincial, the SP gained a foothold, especially in the province of North Brabant.

Since 1977, SP attempted to enter the House of Representatives, but the party failed in 1977, 1981, 1982, 1986 and 1989. In 1991, the SP officially scrapped the term Marxism–Leninism because the party had evolved to the point that the term was no longer considered appropriate.

After 1994 
In 1994 general election, the party's first members of parliament, namely Remi Poppe and Jan Marijnissen, were elected. Its slogan was "Vote Against". In the 1990s, the major party of the Dutch left, the Labour Party (PvdA), moved to the centre, making the SP and the GreenLeft viable alternatives for some left-wing voters. In the 1998 general election, the party was rewarded for its opposition to the purple government of the first Kok cabinet and more than doubled its seats to five. In the 1999 European Parliament election, Erik Meijer was elected into the European Parliament for the SP.

In the 2002 general election, the SP ran with the slogan "Vote in Favor". The party nearly doubled to nine seats. This result was kept in the 2003 general election. Leading up to the latter election, the SP was predicted to win as many as 24 (16%) seats in the polls. However, these gains failed to materialise as many potential SP voters chose to cast strategic votes for the Labour Party which stood a good chance of winning the elections. In the 2004 European Parliament election, its one seat was doubled to two.

In the 2005 referendum on the European Constitution, the SP was the only left-wing party in parliament to oppose it. Support for the party grew in opinion polls, but it fell slightly after the referendum.

The 2006 municipal elections were a success for the SP which more than doubled its total number of seats. This can in part be explained by the party standing in many more municipalities, but it can also be seen as a reaction to the so-called "right-wing winter" in national politics as the welfare reforms of the right-wing second Balkenende cabinet were called by its centre-left and left-wing opponents. In a reaction to these results, Marijnissen declared on election night that the "SP has grown up".

After the untimely end of the second Balkenende cabinet and the minority government of the third Balkenende cabinet, the SP gained 16 seats in the parliament after the 2006 general election, nearly tripling its parliamentary representation. With 25 seats, the SP became the third largest party of the Dutch parliament. In the 2006–2007 cabinet formation, the SP was unable to work out its policy differences with the Christian Democratic Appeal (CDA) and remained in opposition against the fourth Balkenende cabinet which comprised the CDA, the PvdA and the Christian Union parties.

In the 2007 provincial elections, the SP gained 54 provincial legislators more than in the 2003 provincial elections and made it to a total of 83 provincial legislators. As a result of the provincial elections, the SP has increased its representatives in the Senate of the Netherlands (upper house) to 11 from the 4 it had previously.

In the 2010 general election, the SP fared worse than in the previous election, with a loss of 10 seats, a gain of 15 and only 9.9% of the overall vote. The party's popularity rose after the election, with polls throughout 2012 indicating it could challenge the ruling VVD with a seat count reaching into the 30s. The SP's popularity peaked in early August, a month before the election, with polls from Peil, Ipsos, and TNS NIPO indicating it would become the largest party with a result as high as 37 seats. However, PvdA's popularity surged in the final weeks, and the SP's lead collapsed. The party ultimately placed fourth on 15 seats, with a slight decrease in its vote share compared to 2010.

In the 2017 general election, the SP lost one seat and finished sixth.

Name 
The party was founded as the Communist Party of the Netherlands/Marxist–Leninist (KPN/ML) in 1971. This was due to the Dutch spelling reforms at the time.

Ideology and issues 
The party labels itself as socialist, and has also been described as social-democratic. In its manifesto of principles, it calls for a society where human dignity, equality and solidarity are most important. Its core issues are employment, social welfare and investing in health care, public education and public safety. The party opposes privatisation of public services and is critical of globalisation. It has taken a soft Eurosceptic stance.

Election results

House of Representatives

Senate

European Parliament

Leadership

Leadership 

 Leaders
 Daan Monjé (22 October 1971 – 1 October 1986)
 Hans van Hooft Sr. (1 October 1986 – 20 May 1988)
 Jan Marijnissen (20 May 1988 – 20 June 2008)
 Agnes Kant (20 June 2008 – 5 March 2010)
 Emile Roemer (5 March 2010 – 13 December 2017)
 Lilian Marijnissen (13 December 2017 – present)
 Chairmen
 Hans van Hooft Sr. (22 October 1971 – 20 May 1988)
 Jan Marijnissen (20 May 1988 – 28 November 2015)
 Ron Meyer (28 November 2015 –  14 December 2019)
 Jannie Visscher (14 December 2019 – present)
 Secretaries
 Tiny Kox (20 January 1994 – 24 May 2003)
 Paulus Jansen (24 May 2003 – 20 June 2005)
 Hans van Heijningen (20 June 2005 – 20 January 2018)
 Lieke Smits (20 January 2018 – 14 December 2019)
 Arnout Hoekstra (14 December 2019 – present)
 Parliamentary leaders in the Senate
 Jan de Wit (13 June 1995 – 19 May 1998)
 Bob Ruers (19 May 1998 – 10 June 2003)
 Tiny Kox (10 June 2003 – present)
 Parliamentary leaders in the House of Representatives
 Jan Marijnissen (17 May 1994 – 20 June 2008)
 Agnes Kant (20 June 2008 – 5 March 2010)
 Emile Roemer (5 March 2010 – 13 December 2017)
 Lilian Marijnissen (13 December 2017 – present)
 Lijsttrekker in general elections
 Remi Poppe – 1977
 Hans van Hooft Sr. – 1981, 1982, 1986
 Jan Marijnissen – 1989, 1994, 1998, 2002, 2003, 2006 
 Emile Roemer – 2010, 2012, 2017
 Lilian Marijnissen - 2021

Representation

Members of the House of Representatives 
Current members of the House of Representatives since the 2021 Dutch general election:
 Lilian Marijnissen, parliamentary leader
 Renske Leijten
 Sandra Beckerman
 Jasper van Dijk
 Maarten Hijink
 Bart van Kent
 Peter Kwint
 Michiel van Nispen
 Mahir Alkaya

Members of the Senate 
Current members of the Senate since the 2019 Dutch Senate election:
 Tiny Kox, parliamentary leader
 Arda Gerkens, deputy parliamentary leader and parliamentary secretary
 Bastiaan van Apeldoorn
 Rik Janssen

Members of the European Parliament 

The party currently has no members of the European Parliament since the 2019 European Parliamentary election.

Local and provincial government 
Former SP leader Emile Roemer was the first party member who became both mayor and commissioner (he was acting mayor of Heerlen and Alkmaar, and has been King's Commissioner of Limburg since 1 December 2021). The SP is part of the provincial executive (Gedeputeerde staten) in six out of twelve provinces. The SP is also part of several municipal executives (College van burgemeester en wethouders), notably in Amsterdam and Utrecht.

Organisation 
As of 2016, the SP has 41,710 members and has grown considerably since it entered parliament in 1994, making it the third largest party in terms of its number of members. Like other parties in the Netherlands, the SP has seen a decline in membership in recent years.

Organisational structure 
The highest body within the SP is the party council, formed by the chairs of all local branches and the party board. It convenes at least four times a year. The party board is elected by the party congress which is formed by delegates from the municipal branches. The congress decides on the order of the candidates for national and European elections and it has a final say over the party program.

At the party congress which was held on 28 November in 2015, Ron Meyer was elected as the secretary of the party board. Previously, he was working for the Netherlands Trade Union Confederation (FNV). Ron Meyer was elected along with 10 other party board members.

Lilian Marijnissen became the leader of the party on 13 December 2017.

The SP is a constant active force in extra-parliamentary protest. Many of its members are active in local campaigning groups, often independent groups dominated by the SP, or in the SP neighbourhood centres, where the party provides help for the working class.

An example more of nationwide nature is the movement for a National Healthcare Fund (Nationaal ZorgFonds). This campaign demonstrates the necessity of a single payer system and wants to remove market and commercialisation aspects of the current healthcare system. The expensive advertising annually organised by healthcare insurance companies in order to attract new customers is a big example. The NHS inspired movement thinks that money should solely be spent on healthcare itself. Switching from one insurance company to another can only be done once every year as restricted by Dutch law.

Linked organisations 
The youth-wing of the Socialist Party is called SP Jongeren. Its old youth-wing was ROOD; the word rood is officially written in capitals but is not an acronym. The SP publishes the magazine the Tribune monthly which was also the name of a historical Communist Party of the Netherlands newspaper. The relationship between Rood and the SP became rocky in 2020 due to the youth wing taking a more radical approach to politics. In late 2020 the party cut ties with ROOD.

Splinter groups 
At one point, two Trotskyist entryist groups operated within the SP. This included Offensive, now called Socialist Alternative, and the International Socialists. The latter was expelled on the grounds of double membership. The similar yet very small group Offensief was not considered a factor of power, but its members were banned from the SP in February 2009, on the grounds of being "a party within a party". Members of the party Socialist Alternative Politics still operate within the SP.

Relationships to other parties 
The SP has always been in opposition on a national level, although there are now numerous examples of government participation on a local and provincial level. On many issues, the SP is the most left-wing party in parliament. Between 1994 and 2002, the Labour Party (PvdA) had a conscious strategy to isolate the party, always voting against the latter's proposals. However, the party did co-operate well with GreenLeft. After its disastrous election result in 2002, the PvdA, now back in opposition, did co-operate with the SP against some of the policies of the centre-right Balkenende government and their relationship improved significantly. New tensions arose after the 2006 general election, when the SP approached the PvdA in electoral support and the PvdA joined the government whereas the SP did not.

As of 2016, the ruling VVD–PvdA coalition has meant that the PvdA lost a huge part of its base. In the polls, the party stand at around 12 seats and losing 26, a stable position for the last three years. Despite that, the SP has gained little to nothing, remaining stable at around 16 seats in the same polls.

Notes

References

Further reading 
 Jan Marijnissen & Karel Glastra van Loon, "The Last War of the 20th Century: Discussions on the new world order" (On the threshold of the new millennium, Jan Marijnissen en Karel Glastra van Loon spoke with prominent experts in the area of peace and security, both within the Netherlands and abroad.)
 Jan Marijnissen, "Enough!: a socialist bites back" (SP-chairman Jan Marijnissen summarises and internationalises his opposition against the ideological mainstream in today's politics throughout the world. Neoliberalism, argues Marijnissen, causes the return of 19th century social and democratic circumstances. Who does not agree, has the duty to stand up and say: enough!)
 Harry van Bommel & Niels de Heij, "A Better Europe Starts Now" (European cooperation has already brought us many benefits, for example in the areas of human rights and of our prosperity. That does not mean that it is always good or that cooperation in all areas offers added value. The outcome of the referendum on the European Constitution demonstrated that a clear majority holds the European Union as it is now in little esteem, and that there was a need for a broad social discussion over Europe and the role of the Netherlands within it. This paper is intended to contribute to such a debate by making proposals for a more democratic, slimmed down, balanced and affordable EU, as well as a fruitful European agricultural policy.)
 Anja Meulenbelt & Harry van Bommel, "The promised land, the stolen land". (March 2007) (A summary of the study by Anja Meulenbelt and Harry van Bommel).

External links 

  
  
 Speech by former SP leader Jan Marijnissen at the congress of the Socialist Left Party of Norway which gives an overview of the SP's history and policies (24 March 2007)

 
Socialist parties in the Netherlands
Organisations based in Utrecht (province)
Amersfoort